The Philippine pitta (Erythropitta erythrogaster) or blue-breasted pitta, is a species of bird in the family Pittidae. It has a pointed beak and has a red belly with a green blue band above. It is found in Indonesia and the Philippines.  Its natural habitat is subtropical or tropical moist lowland forest. It was considered the nominate subspecies of the red-bellied pitta. This species has a wingspan of 20 - 25cm and is 17.5 - 20cm tall. In the class Aves it lays eggs and has feathers covering its entire body, it also has wings and can fly. As the illustration on your right shows it has short tail feathers and has a small brown head.

References

Detailed review on  Accessed December 18, 2016.

Philippine pitta
Endemic birds of the Philippines
Philippine pitta
Philippine pitta
Taxonomy articles created by Polbot